Centerville Historic District  is a national historic district located at Winston-Salem, Forsyth County, North Carolina.  The district encompasses 91 contributing buildings and 1 contributing structure in Winston-Salem.  It includes a mix of residential, commercial, and light industrial buildings built between about 1900 and 1950.  Residential buildings are in a mix of popular architectural styles including Queen Anne, Bungalow / American Craftsman, and Minimal Traditional.

It was listed on the National Register of Historic Places in 2008.

References

Historic districts on the National Register of Historic Places in North Carolina
Queen Anne architecture in North Carolina
Buildings and structures in Winston-Salem, North Carolina
National Register of Historic Places in Winston-Salem, North Carolina